Schumaker Pond is a 35-acre pond created by damming Beaverdam Creek, in Wicomico County, Maryland.  The pond is owned by the City of Salisbury and is on the eastern end of the Salisbury City Park. The maximum water depth is 5 feet near the dam, in the old creek channel.  In the 1950s-60s Schumaker Pond was popular for swimming, but swimming has since been banned due to the large quantities of E-Coli bacteria in the water. Today, the pond is often used for fishing.

Aquatic life
Hydrilla verticillata has been documented in the pond since 1990 and typically reaches 100% coverage.  Nine species of fish have been identified in the pond: 
Largemouth bass
Bluegill sunfish
Creek chubsucker
Golden shiner
Pumpkinseed sunfish
Chain pickerel
Black crappie
Brown bullhead
American eel

References

Chesapeake Bay watershed
Bodies of water of Wicomico County, Maryland
Ponds of the United States